W Kulabindu Singh (born 25 June 1926) is an Indian politician from Manipur and is a member of the Janata Dal party.

He was elected to the Rajya Sabha, the Upper House of the India Parliament, for the term 1990–1996, and was the sole representative for Manipur.

He is married to Shrimati Jampak Devi and had 3 sons and 4 daughters. He lives in Imphal, Manipur.

References

Rajya Sabha members from Manipur
1926 births
Possibly living people
Janata Dal politicians
Manipur politicians